Tatenda Mandaza (born 10 September 1992), known professionally as Tendaness, is a Swazi-born record producer, DJ and songwriter.

Early life and career 
Tatenda Mandaza was born in Mbabane, the capital city of Eswatini. His mother is Swati and his father is Zimbabwean. He began his music career in 2007–2008 in his bedroom after having picked up an interest in the art from a friend in high school. He got his stage name 'Tendaness' from his friend who taught him how to use turntables in 2008. He mastered the process of music production and established his record label, Tendamix Records in 2011. Tendaness has won two national "DJ of the Year" awards in Eswatini (2010–2011 and 2011/2012) and won first place in the Sprite DJ Champion 2011.

In August 2012, Tendaness moved to the United States to attend the University of Oklahoma in Norman, Oklahoma. He studied Advertising with a minor in Film and Media Studies for four years while still making music. Tendaness released his first EP Play on 23 August 2012 under UK based indie label Crossborder Records. He has released many more singles, EPs and official remixes to date. He released a major single "Overload" in 2013. The single featured former Cashtime member Smashis (now Zingah) and rapper Kid Nice. The track was released during his time as Coca-Cola Swaziland Ambassador, as part of the Crazy For Good Campaign. The song gained major airplay in Swaziland and South Africa and had the first ever Swazi music video to be aired on major music channels like MTV Base and Channel O. On 3 March 2016, he released his debut LP "Grande" featuring a roster of upcoming artist from Swaziland and around Africa.

Career 
On March 24, 2017, he released the debut single from his debut album "Tendanes" titled "Jika ft. Bholoja & LO. The song was play-listed radio by stations in many countries in Africa and beyond. He is signed to his own label Tendamix. Tendamix is Mandaza's own label. Jika reached number 1 on the Apple Music Top 100 Charts for Swaziland, reached Number 1 on the SBIS 2 Top 100 songs of 2017, Number 2 on the Y Urban Top 40 Chart and Number 29 on the #YTop100 songs on 2017 Charts on YFM in South Africa (where the song was placed on heavy rotation),  Number 2 on the DJ Edu DNA Top 5 Chart on BBC Radio 1Xtra and number 4 on the Afro Turn Up Charts on PBS 106.7FM in Melbourne, Australia. The music video for "Jika" was later released on June 22, 2018.

Discography

LPs

Official Remixes

Extended plays

Singles

Studio albums

Awards and nominations

References

External links 
Tendaness Official Website

1992 births
Living people
Swazi musicians
South African musicians
South African DJs
Southern African music
Electronic dance music DJs